Watch Your Mouth is a 1978 American comedy-drama television series which aired on Public Broadcasting Service (PBS) public television.  The series focused upon Mr. Geeter (Joe Morton), a resourceful language skills teacher, and his ethnically diverse group of high schoolers. All of the episodes were aired in the New York City metro area, but for various reasons only ten episodes were aired nationally.

Cast
The cast included:
 Joe Morton as Mr. Geeter
 George Campbell as Melvin
 Luis Figueroa as Raoul
 Joanna Glushak as Bonnie
 Glen Harris as Franklin
 Ginny Ortiz as Carmen
 Lionel Pina as Carlos
 Jody Price as Mary
 Robert Rush as Bobby

Reaction to Series by PBS
Dissatisfied with the quality of the production, PBS initially planned to not air the series at all.  According to Ron Devillier, who served as director of programming administration at the time, PBS later decided that the series was "important and that we should run something."  The network decided to air ten episodes on the national network.

References

External links 
 

1978 American television series debuts
1978 American television series endings
1970s American comedy-drama television series
1970s American high school television series
1970s American workplace comedy television series
1970s American workplace drama television series
PBS original programming
Television series about educators
Television series about teenagers